Mahakavi M. P. Appan (29 March 1913 – 10 December 2003) was a poet and littérateur of Malayalam. He was born in 1913 near Jagathi in Trivandrum district. His parents were Madu and Kochappi. His original name was Ponnappan. He began his career as a school teacher after completing BA Honours from the Kerala University College, Trivandrum. He retired as the District Educational Officer. He had his imprint in the literary field for over 70 years. He was the president of Asan Memorial in Thonnakkal and Mahakavi Ulloor Memorial in Jagathi. He was also a member of the Kerala Sahitya Academy from 1957 to 1967.

Appan was one of the few poets of the modern era to be conferred the prefix "Mahakavi" which means "great poet". He published around 50-odd poetry collections. Some of his works include Suvarnodayam (1936), Vellinakshathram (1939), Leela Soudham (1955), Kilikkonchal (1954), Soundaryadhara (1958), Udyanasoonam (1972), Satyadarsanam (1980) and Jeevithasayahnathil (1986). He won the Kerala Sahitya Akademi Award for Udyanasoonam in 1973. In 1998, he received the Ezhuthachan Award which is Kerala's highest literary honour.

Awards
 Honourary
 1989: Sahitya Kalanidhi title by Kerala Hindi Prachar Sabha
 1994: D.Litt by University of Kerala

 Literary awards
 1973: Kerala Sahitya Akademi Award (for Udyana Soonam)
 1987: Asan Prize
 1994: Guru Chengannur Award
 1995: Vallathol Award
 1998: Ezhuthachan Award
 2003: Ulloor Award

References

1913 births
2003 deaths
Poets from Kerala
Writers from Thiruvananthapuram
People from Thiruvananthapuram district
Indian male poets
Malayali people
Malayalam poets
Malayalam-language writers
Narayana Guru
University College Thiruvananthapuram alumni
Recipients of the Kerala Sahitya Akademi Award
Recipients of the Ezhuthachan Award
20th-century Indian poets